The Iowa State Cyclones softball team represents Iowa State University (ISU) and competes in the Big 12 Conference of NCAA Division I. The team is coached by  Jamie Pinkerton, he is in his 5th year at Iowa State.  The Cyclones play their home games at the Cyclone Sports Complex on Iowa State's campus.

History

The Cyclones had put together a women's softball team by 1971 and appeared in two of the early AIAW Women's College World Series in 1971 and 1973.  In 1971 the Cyclones advanced to the championship final series against John F. Kennedy College, before bowing out with two losses, 6-0 and 4-0. In 1974, under coach Gloria Crosby, the team got off to a strong start, winning two Big Eight Championships in four years.

Iowa State continued their strong start into the 1980s under Head Coach Deb Kuhn. In 1987 the Cyclones made their first ever appearance in the Top 20 culminating in Coach Kuhn being named Big Eight Coach of the Year. The following year Iowa State made their first run in program history in the NCAA Tournament.

The transition from the Big Eight to the Big 12 has proved difficult for the Cyclones. The team has not won more than six conference games in any season since joining the conference. The most wins overall in a single season since the start of the Big 12 is 29.

Jamie Trachsel was the coach of the Cyclones for the 2017 season. She led them to a 23-35 overall record and their best conference standing since 1994. At the conclusion of the season she left the Cyclones to coach the Minnesota Gophers.

The team is currently coached by Jamie Pinkerton, he is in his 5th year at Iowa State.

Record

Individual accomplishments

Olympians

All-Americans

Facilities
The Cyclones play their home games at the $13 million Cyclone Sports Complex that opened in 2012. Some of the state-of-the-art facility's amenities are home and away locker rooms, officials' locker rooms, team meeting rooms, athletic training room, and a seating capacity of 1,500.

References